John Barbee (September 16, 1815 – December 22, 1888) was the tenth Mayor of Louisville, Kentucky from 1855 to 1857 and chiefly remembered for his part in the anti-immigrant riots known as "Bloody Monday".

Life
He was born in Pewee Valley, Kentucky, and, after his parents died, moved to Louisville at age 14. In 1841, he was elected by the city council as a collector of revenues, and after a brief foray back into the private sector, he was elected to the city council in 1849 and 1851. In 1855, as a member of the anti-Catholic, anti-foreigner Know Nothing party, he was elected Mayor over James S. Speed, who did not run for re-election, believing the election was invalid, but his appeal was denied eventually by the Kentucky Supreme Court.

Bloody Monday
The most notable event of his term was "Bloody Monday", an uprising against (mostly Catholic) German and Irish immigrants on August 6, 1855. The day was election day, and despite the likelihood of riots, Barbee would not provide any security at voting booths. Know-Nothings prevented naturalized German and Irish from voting, and riots erupted on the streets of the Butchertown district of Louisville. Germans were beaten and some were killed as the riots spilled into the Irish-dominated Eighth Ward, burning a large row of houses (Quinn's Row). Barbee finally intervened to prevent rioters from destroying the city's Catholic cathedral. Officially, 22 people were killed in the riots, although some sources place the number of deaths at 100 or more. 

After Barbee's term as mayor, he served again on the city council from 1858 to 1861. He became a Democrat after the Civil War. He is buried in Cave Hill Cemetery.

References

 

1815 births
1888 deaths
Burials at Cave Hill Cemetery
Kentucky city council members
Mayors of Louisville, Kentucky
People from Pewee Valley, Kentucky
Kentucky Know Nothings